The West Virginia Division of Corrections and Rehabilitation is an agency of the U.S. state of West Virginia within the state Department of Homeland Security that operates the state's prisons, jails and juvenile detention facilities. The agency has its headquarters in the state's capital of Charleston. The state incarcerates 273 women per 100,000 population, the highest rate of female incarceration in the world, ahead of all other states and foreign nations.

History
On 1 January 1986 a two-day riot began at the West Virginia State Penitentiary resulted in three inmate deaths.

The former Salem Industrial Home for Youth was converted into an adult prison, the Salem Correctional Center, in 2015.

All of the division's facilities are overcrowded and understaffed. Press reports in late 2017 indicated the division was short three hundred correctional officers. Press reports in early 2018 showed that pay for correctional officers in the state ranked 49th in the nation. New correctional officers started at $24,664, about twelve dollars an hour.

From February to July 2018, National Guard troops supplemented the overworked officers. At the end of that period, the Fire Marshal's Office continued to support the division.

Until July 1, 2018, the agency was simply the "West Virginia Division of Corrections" and only operated the adult prisons. On July 1, 2018 the agency absorbed the former West Virginia Division of Juvenile Services and the former West Virginia Regional Jail Authority and assumed its current name.

Facilities

Community Correctional Facilities

Adult Correctional Facilities

County Owned Contract Facilities

Regional Jails

Juvenile Correctional Facilities

Youth Reporting Centers

Fallen officers

Five officers have died in the line of duty.

See also

 List of law enforcement agencies in West Virginia
 List of United States state correction agencies
 List of U.S. state prisons
 West Virginia Penitentiary

References

External links
 Official website of West Virginia Division of Corrections and Rehabilitation

State law enforcement agencies of West Virginia
Juvenile detention centers in the United States
State corrections departments of the United States
 
Lists of United States state prisons
State agencies of West Virginia